Plagiothecium is a genus of moss belonging to the family Plagiotheciaceae. It has a cosmopolitan distribution.

Species
The following species are recognised in the genus Plagiothecium:
 

Plagiothecium acuminatum 
Plagiothecium albescens 
Plagiothecium albulum 
Plagiothecium alpinum 
Plagiothecium aptychopsis 
Plagiothecium argentatum 
Plagiothecium arnoldii 
Plagiothecium auritum 
Plagiothecium austrodenticulatum 
Plagiothecium austropulchellum 
Plagiothecium berggrenianum 
Plagiothecium bicolor 
Plagiothecium cacti 
Plagiothecium cavifolium 
Plagiothecium ceylonense 
Plagiothecium chapmannii 
Plagiothecium chrismarii 
Plagiothecium cochleatum 
Plagiothecium cordifolium 
Plagiothecium corticola 
Plagiothecium curvifolium 
Plagiothecium dehradunense 
Plagiothecium densifolium 
Plagiothecium denticulatum 
Plagiothecium deplanatum 
Plagiothecium doii 
Plagiothecium drepanophyllum 
Plagiothecium enerve 
Plagiothecium entodontella 
Plagiothecium euryphyllum 
Plagiothecium eutrypherum 
Plagiothecium falklandicum 
Plagiothecium fitzgeraldii 
Plagiothecium formosicum 
Plagiothecium fuegianum 
Plagiothecium geminum 
Plagiothecium geophilum 
Plagiothecium georgicoantarcticum 
Plagiothecium glossophylloides 
Plagiothecium gracile 
Plagiothecium handelii 
Plagiothecium helveticum 
Plagiothecium herzogii 
Plagiothecium incurvatum 
Plagiothecium javense 
Plagiothecium laetum 
Plagiothecium laevigatum 
Plagiothecium lamprostachys 
Plagiothecium lancifolium 
Plagiothecium latebricola 
Plagiothecium lonchochaete 
Plagiothecium lonchochaete 
Plagiothecium longisetulum 
Plagiothecium lucidum 
Plagiothecium luridum 
Plagiothecium matsumurae 
Plagiothecium mauiense 
Plagiothecium membranosulum 
Plagiothecium membranosulum 
Plagiothecium microsphaerothecium 
Plagiothecium mildbraedii 
Plagiothecium mollicaule 
Plagiothecium monbuttoviae 
Plagiothecium myurum 
Plagiothecium nanoglobum 
Plagiothecium neckeroideum 
Plagiothecium nemorale 
Plagiothecium nitens 
Plagiothecium nitidifolium 
Plagiothecium noricum 
Plagiothecium novae-valesiae 
Plagiothecium novogranatense 
Plagiothecium obtusissimum 
Plagiothecium orthocarpum 
Plagiothecium ovalifolium 
Plagiothecium paleaceum 
Plagiothecium perminutum 
Plagiothecium piliferum 
Plagiothecium pilosum 
Plagiothecium planissimum 
Plagiothecium platycladum 
Plagiothecium platyphyllum 
Plagiothecium podperae 
Plagiothecium pseudolaetum 
Plagiothecium regnellii 
Plagiothecium rhynchostegioides 
Plagiothecium robustum 
Plagiothecium rossicum 
Plagiothecium sakuraii 
Plagiothecium sandbergii 
Plagiothecium sandwicense 
Plagiothecium scalpellifolium 
Plagiothecium schofieldii 
Plagiothecium seligeri 
Plagiothecium shevockii 
Plagiothecium shinii 
Plagiothecium splendescens 
Plagiothecium standleyi 
Plagiothecium strenuum 
Plagiothecium subdentatum 
Plagiothecium subglaucum 
Plagiothecium subjulaceum 
Plagiothecium sublaetum 
Plagiothecium submollicaule 
Plagiothecium subpinnatum 
Plagiothecium subsimplex 
Plagiothecium subteres 
Plagiothecium subulatum 
Plagiothecium succulentum 
Plagiothecium svalbardense 
Plagiothecium svihlae 
Plagiothecium tenellum 
Plagiothecium tenerum 
Plagiothecium tjuzenii 
Plagiothecium tjuzenii 
Plagiothecium tosaense 
Plagiothecium uematsui 
Plagiothecium undulatum 
Plagiothecium unilaterale 
Plagiothecium vesiculariopsis 
Plagiothecium vulgare 
Plagiothecium yasudae 
Plagiothecium zerovii

References

Hypnales
Moss genera